Hinematioro  (–1823) was the acknowledged leader of  Te Aitanga-a-Hauiti, a New Zealand Māori iwi (tribe). She identified with the Ngati Porou iwi. In Māori culture she is an ariki tapairu, or first-born in a notable family, and her influence and mana were wider than her tribal leadership.

Her mother was Ngunguru-te-rangi, and her father was Tane-toko-rangi.

References

1823 deaths
Ngāti Porou people
Year of birth unknown
19th-century women rulers
Year of birth uncertain